Basirhat is a city of West Bengal, India. It is located on the banks of the Ichamati (Ichhamati) River.

Geography

Location

Area overview
The area shown in the map is a part of the Ichhamati-Raimangal Plain, located in the lower Ganges Delta. It contains soil of mature black or brownish loam to recent alluvium. Numerous rivers, creeks and khals criss-cross the area. The tip of the Sundarbans National Park is visible in the lower part of the map (shown in green but not marked). The larger full screen map shows the full forest area. A large section of the area is a part of the Sundarbans settlements. The densely populated area is an overwhelmingly rural area. Only 12.96% of the population lives in the urban areas and 87.04% of the population lives in the rural areas.

Note: The map alongside presents some of the notable locations in the subdivision. All places marked in the map are linked in the larger full screen map.

Civic administration

Police station
Basirhat police station covers an area of 267 km2 and serves a population of 637,538. Basirhat PS has under it Basirhat town outpost and two other outposts at Panitor and Boatghat. The police district has a 22 km border, out which 14 km is land border and 8 km is riverine border. 11 km of the border remains unfenced. Basirhat PS has jurisdiction over Basirhat municipal area and Basirhat I CD Block.

Around half of the 4,095 km long India-Bangladesh border has been fenced and vigil along the border has been tightened up. As of 2017, Cattle smuggling across the border was unofficially estimated to be a Rs. 4,000 crore business, half of it across the Basirhat border and the balance through Malda and Murshidabad.

In 2017, The Sunday Guardian reported, “The crackdown by the Border Security Force (BSF) on the illegal, but lucrative, business of cow smuggling along the India-Bangladesh border in West Bengal’s North 24 Parganas district, resulted in immense resentment among a section of the area’s minority community. This culminated in the communal flare-up in the state’s Basirhat sub-division earlier this month. A source close to the state’s ruling Trinamool Congress told The Sunday Guardian over phone, “Cow smuggling to Bangladesh, through the riverine border in Basirhat, Taki and other adjoining areas, has taken a hit as the BSF has become very strict and is maintaining a constant vigil. This has hurt the locals, who were earning crores from these illegal activities. Rendered jobless, they blamed the situation on the majority community.””

CD block HQ
The headquarters of Basirhat I CD block are located at Basihat.

Demographics 
According to the 2011 census, Basirhat Urban Agglomeration had a population of 144,891, out of which 73,491 were males and 71,400 were females. Population in the age range 0–6 years was 12,578. Effective literacy rate for the 7+ population was 86.88 percent. Bengali is the principal language spoken in the area.

Education 
Basirhat College was established in 1947. Affiliated with the West Bengal State University, it offers honours courses in Bengali, English, Sanskrit, philosophy, political science, history, geography, education, accountancy, mathematics, physics, chemistry, botany, zoology, physiology and economics. It also offers general courses in arts, science and commerce, and a post-graduate course in Bengali.

Healthcare 
Basirhat District Hospital functions with 300 beds.

Basirhat is one of the areas where ground water is affected by arsenic contamination.

External links 
 Basirhat Municipality Website
Paikpara (Basirhat)

References 

 
Cities and towns in North 24 Parganas district
Cities in West Bengal